NGC 852 is a barred spiral galaxy located in the Eridanus constellation. It is estimated to be 281 million light-years from the Milky Way and has a diameter of about 110,000 light-years. NGC 852 was discovered on October 27, 1834, by John Herschel.

References

External links 
 

Barred spiral galaxies
852
Discoveries by William Herschel
Eridanus (constellation)
008195